The George H. Gallup House built in 1901 is an historic octagonal house located at 703 South Chestnut Street in Jefferson, Iowa, United States. It was the birthplace and boyhood home of Dr. George Horace Gallup, the pioneer of public opinion polling.  On July 18, 1985, it was listed on the National Register of Historic Places.
 
George H. Gallup was committed to the octagon house, having built three of them. The first was built in 1893 on North Elm Street in Jefferson. It featured Queen Anne detailing, and it was somewhat asymmetrical because of its porch and bay placement. He sold this house in 1899 and began building a second one. Gallup began building his third and final octagon house in 1901 and completed it the following year. It was in this house that his son George was born and raised. The 2-story frame house is built on a rubble coursed stone foundation. The house is capped with a truncated octagonal roof.

See also
George Gallup
Gallup & Robinson
The Gallup Organization
Gallup Poll
List of octagonal houses

References

External links
 The Gallup House Website
 The Gallup House Property
 Greene County Attractions

Houses completed in 1902
Jefferson, Iowa
Houses on the National Register of Historic Places in Iowa
Houses in Greene County, Iowa
Octagon houses in the United States
Queen Anne architecture in Iowa
Neoclassical architecture in Iowa
Octagon houses in Iowa
National Register of Historic Places in Greene County, Iowa